The Sun Has Ears is a 1996 Hong Kong drama film directed by Yim Ho. It was entered into the 46th Berlin International Film Festival where Yim Ho won the Silver Bear for Best Director.

Cast
 Qiang Gao
 You Yong
 Yu Zhang

References

External links

1996 films
1990s Cantonese-language films
1996 drama films
Films directed by Yim Ho
Hong Kong drama films
1990s Hong Kong films